In Greek mythology, Argiope (Ancient Greek: Αργιόπη "silver face") may refer to:
 Argiope, naiad daughter of the River God Nile. She was wife of Agenor and mother of Europa, Cadmus, Phoenix and Cilix. More commonly known as Telephassa.
 Argiope, naiad, possibly the daughter of the river-god Cephissus, mother of Thamyris by Philammon. She lived at first on Mount Parnassus but when Philammon refused to take her into his house as his wife, she left Parnassus and went to the country of the Odrysians in Thrace when pregnant.
 Argiope, naiad of the town of Eleusis, mother of Cercyon by Branchus. Possibly same as the above Argiope thus, a daughter of the river-god Cephissus.
 Argiope, daughter of Teuthras, king of Teuthrania, a region near Mysia in Asia Minor. She married Telephus, son of Heracles.

Not to be confused with Agriope (Ἀγριόπην)

Agriope, another name for Eurydice, wife of Orpheus whom the hero unsuccessfully brought back from Hades.

Notes

References 

 Apollodorus, The Library with an English Translation by Sir James George Frazer, F.B.A., F.R.S. in 2 Volumes, Cambridge, MA, Harvard University Press; London, William Heinemann Ltd. 1921. ISBN 0-674-99135-4. Online version at the Perseus Digital Library. Greek text available from the same website.
Diodorus Siculus, The Library of History translated by Charles Henry Oldfather. Twelve volumes. Loeb Classical Library. Cambridge, Massachusetts: Harvard University Press; London: William Heinemann, Ltd. 1989. Vol. 3. Books 4.59–8. Online version at Bill Thayer's Web Site
 Diodorus Siculus, Bibliotheca Historica. Vol 1-2. Immanel Bekker. Ludwig Dindorf. Friedrich Vogel. in aedibus B. G. Teubneri. Leipzig. 1888-1890. Greek text available at the Perseus Digital Library.
 Pausanias, Description of Greece with an English Translation by W.H.S. Jones, Litt.D., and H.A. Ormerod, M.A., in 4 Volumes. Cambridge, MA, Harvard University Press; London, William Heinemann Ltd. 1918. Online version at the Perseus Digital Library
 Pausanias, Graeciae Descriptio. 3 vols. Leipzig, Teubner. 1903.  Greek text available at the Perseus Digital Library.

Naiads
Children of Nilus
Children of Potamoi
Princesses in Greek mythology